Sojat is a city, a municipality and Tehsil headquarters in Pali district of Rajasthan state. It is situated on the left bank of the Sukri River. It is famous for its mehendi farms and production.

History
There is also a large and famous fort situated on top of one of the hillock. The fort has a big reservoir and several temples.

Geography
It has an average elevation of 257 metres (843 feet).

Demographics
 2001 census, Sojat had a population of 50,061 in 9,205 households. The municipality had a sex ratio of 927 females per 1,000 males. Sojat has an average literacy rate of 66.7%, lower than the national average of 74.04%: male literacy is 77.7%, and female literacy is 55.5%. In Sojat, 13% of the population is under 6 years of age. Pin Code of Sojat is 306104 which comes under pali postal division (Jodhpur Region)

Economy
Sojat is a hub of Mehndi (Henna) cultivation. Due to its favourable climatic conditions and soil, Sojat is the only region in India where henna is grown and are exported worldwide.

Sojat mehndi has now received the Geographical Indication (GI) certificate.

References

External links

 Sojat City

Cities and towns in Pali district